Pathfinder (also known by the alternate title Pathfinder: Legend of the Ghost Warrior) is a 2007 American epic action film directed by Marcus Nispel and written by Laeta Kalogridis. Distributed by 20th Century Fox, it stars Karl Urban, Clancy Brown, Ralf Moeller, Moon Bloodgood, Russell Means, Jay Tavare, and Nathaniel Arcand.

Pathfinder received a negative critical reception and was a box office failure, grossing about USD 31 million compared to a budget of 45 million; it managed another estimated USD 22 million in DVD sales.

The film was loosely based on a 1987 Norwegian film Pathfinder. It was also adapted into a graphic novel by Dark Horse Comics in 2006.

Plot
A Viking Age expedition arrives in North America, intending to subjugate or slaughter the native "Skræling" population. The party is itself wiped out by another native tribe, the only survivor being the Viking leader's son, who is adopted by a native woman. The boy is taken in by the local tribe and named "Ghost" for his paleness.

Fifteen years later, Ghost still lives among the tribe. Though he is socially accepted, he has yet to earn the status of a warrior. His romantic interest is Starfire, the daughter of the Pathfinder, an elderly chief of a neighboring tribe. The only remembrance he keeps of his heritage is his father's sword.

In an attack by a new group of Viking raiders, Ghost's village is destroyed and all its inhabitants killed, except a few tribesmen whom the attackers force  into single combat. Viking leader Gunnar challenges Ghost, who is still in possession of his father's sword. He defeats Ulfar, cutting out his eye before escaping.

Ghost is pursued by the Vikings and receives an arrow wound. He reaches the neighboring tribe and is tended to by Pathfinder and his daughter. Ghost advises the villagers to flee and departs to take on the Vikings alone. He is joined by Jester, a mute admirer who refuses to leave his side, and Starfire, who leaves the tribe for him. They defeat a few Vikings and collect their arms and armour. Pathfinder goes after his daughter and joins the fight. Eventually, both Jester and Pathfinder are executed brutally, and Ghost and Starfire are captured. The Vikings threaten to torture Starfire if Ghost will not betray the location of the other villages. Ghost pretends to lead the Vikings to the tribe and kills most of them on the way, some drowning in a lake and others caught in an avalanche. Ghost eventually kills Gunnar in a duel  on a cliff's edge

Ghost returns to Starfire with Pathfinder's necklace, thus making Starfire the new Pathfinder after her father. Ghost, now finally respected as the bravest of the tribe and one of their own, assumes his position watching over the coast in case the Vikings ever return.

Cast
Karl Urban as Ghost 
Moon Bloodgood as Starfire 
Clancy Brown as Gunnar
Ralf Moeller as Ulfar
Russell Means as Pathfinder
Nathaniel Arcand as Wind In Tree 
Jay Tavare as Blackwing
Kevin Loring as Jester 
Duane Howard as Elder

Unrated version
For the theatrical release and the initial DVD release, director Marcus Nispel had been forced to cut the gore and digitally remove some of the extreme violence out of at least 32 scenes, and also a scene of Ghost and Starfire making love in a cave, so that the film could gain an R rating from the MPAA. Nispel was also forced to trim down 23 scenes (including significant plot development) for reasons of time and pacing. In total around ten minutes were cut out of the film. These cuts were restored however, as well as the gore, for the unrated version, which was released on 31 July 2007.

Reception

Critical reception
The film received generally negative reviews, with a 9% approval rating on Rotten Tomatoes based on 77 reviews, and a score of 29 on Metacritic based on 23 reviews, indicating "generally unfavorable reviews".

A review on the BBC website gave the film two out of five stars, stating, "...this Norse saga plays like a 100 minute trailer; there's no character development, no real plot, just a string of high-concept action sequences... ...director Marcus Nispel [a veteran director of music videos] helms it like it's a nu-metal video: swirling dry ice, thundering Dolby sound effects, and oversized Vikings who look like WWF wrestlers. Metalheads will be in Valhalla; everyone else should find a different path."  Peter Debruge of Variety wrote, "This latest bit of historical balder-dash stands in direct defiance of proven action-movie formulas, trusting its brutal concept and striking visuals to overcome a lack of star power."  Manohla Dargis of The New York Times wrote, "All grunting, all goring, the witless action flick "Pathfinder" has little to recommend it".  Michael Ordona of the Los Angeles Times called it unintentionally funny, and Mick LaSalle of the San Francisco Chronicle called it a failed attempt to make an art-house film out of a concept better suited to an exploitation film.

Among the more positive reviews, Kirk Honeycutt of The Hollywood Reporter stated that the film "nicely balances action and adventure with American Indian wisdom and a modest romance to provide a graphic-comic-book movie experience for males in urban markets." Wesley Morris of The Boston Globe praised the "grueling action sequences", granting that the filmmakers  "choreograph some excitement" in two scenes "in a 99-minute adventure that feels longer than that".

Box office
Pathfinder opened theatrically in the United States on 13 April 2007, in sixth place on its opening weekend and had some big competition at the box office with 300, Blades of Glory, and Disturbia amongst others, and although Pathfinder earned over $5 million in its opening weekend at the box office, this quickly tailed off. Overall, worldwide the film earned just over $30 million at the box office, failing to recoup its $45 million budget, though it eventually made back its money through DVD sales.

Home video releases
The DVD of the film was released 31 July 2007. Nearly a million and a half DVDs of the film were sold in the United States, for an estimated $22,083,551 from the DVD sales. The film was released on Blu-ray on 20 November 2007.

Graphic novel
The film was also adapted into a graphic novel by Dark Horse Comics. The graphic novel was built around dialogue written by the film screenwriter Laeta Kalogridis and with art by comic book artist Christopher Shy. It was subsequently published by Dark Horse Comics at the same time as the film. From the beginning the graphic novel had a symbiotic relationship with the film. Film director Marcus Nispel, also a graphic novelist, decided to adapt the screenplay into a comic book format to appeal to his target audience more and help get a fan base to get his film made. However, his film got the green light before the graphic novel could be completed.

See also
 Pathfinder (1987 film)

References

External links
 Pathfinder Set Visit – Part 1
 Pathfinder Set Visit – Part 2

 

2007 films
Old Norse-language films
2007 action drama films
20th Century Fox films
2000s English-language films
2000s survival films
Action film remakes
American action drama films
American epic films
American historical action films
American remakes of Norwegian films
American survival films
Avalanches in film
Dune Entertainment films
Films about Native Americans
Films about mass murder
Films about violence
Films directed by Marcus Nispel
Films scored by Jonathan Elias
Films set in jungles
Films set in pre-Columbian America
Films set in the Viking Age
Films shot in Vancouver
Films with screenplays by Laeta Kalogridis
Phoenix Pictures films
2000s American films